William Henry Carpenter may refer to:

William Henry Carpenter (philologist) (1853–1936), American philologist
William Carpenter (Australian politician) (1863–1930), Australian politician

See also
William Carpenter (disambiguation)